The Carlsberg Cup was a football competition played for two seasons between clubs in the Irish League in 1972-73 and 1973-74. Held at the beginning of each season, it consisted solely of twelve Irish League clubs in the first season, and in the second season it consisted of twelve Irish League Clubs and four B Division teams.

Final results

Sources
Malcolm Brodie, "100 Years of Irish Football", Blackstaff Press, Belfast (1980)

References

External links
Irish League Archive - Carlsberg Cup

Defunct association football cup competitions in Northern Ireland